Huis De Pinto is a former Amsterdam city mansion on the Sint Antoniesbreestraat near the Rembrandthuis. It was originally built in 1605 but is named after a leading Amsterdam family dynasty of Portuguese-Jewish merchant bankers. The founder of this dynasty was Isaack de Pinto, from Antwerp, who moved to Rotterdam in 1647 but bought the house in 1651. His son commissioned the unusual facade, and his grandson Isaac de Pinto grew up there.

Construction
It was built in 1605 as a double house.
The unusual facade uniting the two houses was added after 1680.

Residents and Functions
In 1605, Jan Jansz. Carel (1545-1616), a VOC director owned both houses and rented them out.
In 1622 Albert Burgh's brother, the brewer Abel Mathijsz. Burch bought them (and rented them out).
 In 1651 they were sold by the Burch heirs to Isaack de Pinto (who died 1681)
Inherited by his only son David de Pinto, who bought the neighboring house in 1686 and ordered the double facade designed by Elias Bouman. 
Sold in 1756 by Aron de David de Pinto
Almost demolished during WWII
Restored in 1975
Public library 1975-2012
Offices and community hall

References
 rijksmonument nr. 5431
 F. ten Cate (1988) Dit volckje seer verwoet: een geschiedenis van de Sint Antoniesbreestraat.

Rijksmonuments in Amsterdam
Houses completed in 1605
1605 establishments in the Dutch Republic
Jews and Judaism in Amsterdam
Sephardi Jewish culture in the Netherlands